Cornelius Joseph 'Con' McCormack (25 December 1877 – 8 September 1940) was an Australian rules footballer who played for the Collingwood Football Club in the Victorian Football League (VFL).

A centreman, McCormack was a premiership player in each of his two seasons at Collingwood. He experienced just three losses from his 31 games and in 1904 moved to Western Australia where he continued his football career.

References

 
Holmesby, Russell and Main, Jim (2007). The Encyclopedia of AFL Footballers. 7th ed. Melbourne: Bas Publishing.

1877 births
Australian rules footballers from Victoria (Australia)
Collingwood Football Club players
Collingwood Football Club Premiership players
1940 deaths
Two-time VFL/AFL Premiership players